Hellinsia grandaevus is a moth of the family Pterophoridae. It is found in Chile, Argentina and Bolivia.

The wingspan is 17‑22 mm. The forewings are pale brown, mixed with scattered dark brown scales. The hindwings are grey‑brown and the fringes are grey. Adults are on wing from October to January.

References

Moths described in 1931
grandaevus
Pterophoridae of South America
Fauna of Chile
Moths of South America